Hirameki International Group Inc. was an American company founded in March 2000 which specialized in translating visual novels from Japan and releasing them to the American market. It is named after the Japanese word for the noun "flash" or "insight". On January 2, 2008, the company elected to bow out of games production.

Products

AnimePlay PC
The AnimePlay PC line—titles that are visual novels that can only be played via a PC.

 Ai Yori Aoshi
 Animamundi: Dark Alchemist
 Piece of Wonder
 Ever17
 Yo-Jin-Bo

AnimePlay DVD
These titles are visual novels that can be played via a DVD player.
 Amusement Park
 Day of Love
 Dragonia
 Exodus Guilty
 Hourglass of Summer
 Ishika & Honori
 Phantom of Inferno
 Tea Society of a Witch

References

External links
 Hirameki International official website  (archived from the original) 

Anime companies
Video game companies established in 2000
American companies established in 2000